Frakefamide (INN) is a synthetic, fluorinated linear tetrapeptide with the amino acid sequence Tyr-D-Ala-(p-F)Phe-Phe-NH2 which acts as a peripherally-specific, selective μ-opioid receptor agonist. Despite its inability to penetrate the blood-brain-barrier and enter the central nervous system, frakefamide has potent analgesic effects and, unlike centrally-acting opioids like morphine, does not produce respiratory depression, indicating that its antinociceptive effects are mediated by peripheral μ-opioid receptors. It was under development for the treatment of pain by AstraZeneca and Shire but was shelved after phase II clinical trials.

See also 
 Casokefamide
 Metkefamide

References 

Analgesics
Fluoroarenes
Opioid peptides
Peripherally selective drugs
Tetrapeptides